The 1924–25 William & Mary Indians men's basketball team represented the College of William & Mary in intercollegiate basketball during the 1924–25 season. Under the second year of head coach J. Wilder Tasker (who concurrently served as the head football and baseball coach), the team finished the season with an 11–6 record. This was the 20th season of the collegiate basketball program at William & Mary, whose nickname is now the Tribe. The team played as an independent; William & Mary would not join the Southern Conference until 1936.

Program notes
At the start of the 1924 season, William & Mary adopted green, gold, and silver as its official colors, switching from orange and black.

Schedule

|-
!colspan=9 style="background:#006400; color:#FFD700;"| Regular season

Source

References

William & Mary Tribe men's basketball seasons
William And Mary Indians
William and Mary Indians Men's Basketball Team
William and Mary Indians Men's Basketball Team